The 1987 San Francisco 49ers season was the franchise's 38th season in the National Football League and their 42nd overall. The 49ers won the division for the second consecutive season, and ended the season as the top seed in the NFC playoffs. The season ended with an upset loss to the Minnesota Vikings in the divisional round of the playoffs.

The season 
The 49ers lost the first game of the season to Pittsburgh. In their second game, against Cincinnati, it appeared that they were going to start the season 0–2, down by 6 points with just 2 seconds to play. However, quarterback Joe Montana threw a 25-yard pass to wide receiver Jerry Rice as time expired. The 49ers used the victory as a springboard to a 13–1 run to end the season with the best record in the NFL.

The 49ers scored 459 points, the most in the NFL in 1987; they also scored 206 more points than they allowed, best in the league as well. The 49ers gained the most total yards (5,987), the most rushing yards (2,237) and second most passing yards (3,750) in the NFL in 1987.

Wide receiver Jerry Rice was named NFL Offensive Player of the Year and the Bert Bell Award (for Player of the Year). Rice caught 22 touchdown passes in a strike-shortened 12 games (1 game was canceled because of the strike, and Rice didn't play in the next 3 games while the strike was on). This record stood for twenty years. Rice led the league in receiving yards per game (89.8), total touchdowns (23: 22 receiving, 1 rushing), and points scored (138). Quarterback Joe Montana (who crossed the picket line during the strike) led the league with 31 touchdown passes. He also led the league in passer rating (102.1) and completion percentage (66.8%).

The San Francisco defense was also very strong, surrendering the fewest total yards (4,095), fewest passing yards (2,484) and fifth-fewest rushing yards (1,611) in the NFL in 1987. The 1987 49ers have the best passer rating differential (offensive passer rating minus opponents' combined passer rating) of the Live Ball Era (1978–present), with +52.4.

Offseason 
When the Tampa Bay Buccaneers selected quarterback Vinny Testaverde first overall in the 1987 NFL Draft, Tampa Bay quarterback Steve Young was traded to the 49ers on April 24, 1987. The Buccaneers received 2nd and 4th round draft picks in the trade, which they used to draft Miami linebacker Winston Moss, and Arizona State wide receiver Bruce Hill.

NFL draft 

 Harris Barton was the first offensive tackle selected in the first round of the NFL Draft by the 49ers since Forrest Blue was selected in 1968.

Personnel

Staff

NFL replacement players 
After the league decided to use replacement players during the NFLPA strike, the following team was assembled:

Roster

Regular season 
In 1987, Jerry Rice led the NFL with 22 touchdown receptions. The runner-up was Philadelphia Eagles receiver Mike Quick with 11. This marked the first time in NFL history that a category leader doubled the total of his nearest competitor.

Schedule

Game summaries

Week 2

Standings

Postseason

NFC Divisional Playoff vs Minnesota Vikings 

The 13–2 49ers suffered one of the biggest upsets in playoff history as the 8–7 Vikings came into Candlestick and beat the 49ers 36–24. Vikings QB Wade Wilson threw for 298 yards, and Anthony Carter caught 10 passes for 227 yards. Joe Montana struggled so much that Steve Young came in to relieve him. Though he played better, it wasn't enough. The Vikings took a 20–3 halftime lead, and held on for the major upset.

Awards and records 
 Jerry Rice, Franchise Record, Most Touchdowns in One Season, 23 touchdowns (22 receiving, 1 rushing)
 Jerry Rice, Franchise Record, Most Points in One Season, 138 points
 Jerry Rice, NFL Leader, 23 touchdowns
 Jerry Rice, Bert Bell Award

Notes

References

External links 
 1987 49ers on Pro Football Reference
 49ers Schedule on jt-sw.com

San Francisco
NFC West championship seasons
San Francisco 49ers seasons
1987 in San Francisco
San